Orobas: Book of Angels Volume 4 is an album by Koby Israelite performing compositions from John Zorn's second Masada book, "The Book of Angels".

Reception
The Allmusic review by Thom Jurek awarded the album 4 stars stating "Orobas: Book of Angels, Vol. 4 is another essential Four-for-four and counting. This is the most exhilarating set of recordings Tzadik has offered in quite some time. For those who haven't yet checkout Israelite, this is a fantastic opportunity".

Track listing
All compositions by John Zorn.
 "Rampel" - 6:31
 "Zafiel" - 4:40
 "Ezgadi" - 5:16
 "Nisroc" - 4:56
 "Negef" - 5:54
 "Khabiel" - 6:28
 "Chayo" - 6:27
 "Rachmiel" - 8:08
Recorded in London, UK in November–December 2005

Personnel
Koby Israelite – drums, percussion, accordion, keyboards, guitar, bouzouki, Indian banjo, vocals, flute, electric bass, cajón, arrangements 
Sid Gauld – trumpet 
Yaron Stavi – basses, vocals 
Stewart Curtis – recorder, piccolo, clarinet

References

2006 albums
Albums produced by John Zorn
Book of Angels albums
Tzadik Records albums
Koby Israelite albums